Mid-term parliamentary elections were held in Cuba on 1 November 1918 in order to fill half the seats in the House of Representatives. The National Conservative Party was the biggest winner, taking 33 of the 61 seats.

Results

References

Cuba
Parliamentary elections in Cuba
1918 in Cuba
November 1918 events
Election and referendum articles with incomplete results